is a Japanese voice actress and narrator. She was affiliated with AIR AGENCY and became a freelancer. She works at Stay Luck.

Filmography

Anime series
 Hanasaku Iroha - Absent Call, Student A, B and C
 Heaven's Memo Pad - Girl A
 Kaitō Tenshi Twin Angel - Schoolgirl E
 AKB0048 - Gina, Candidate A
 Campione! - Woman
 High School DxD - Woman
 Hunter × Hunter (Second Version) - Machi, Reporter
 Lagrange: The Flower of Rin-ne - Yuina Niisho, Kurumi Mamaai
 Anpanman - Iroenbitsuman
 Tari Tari - Matsuko Arita, Takahashi's baby
 Waiting in the Summer - Shop Assistant, Student
 AKB0048 next stage - Gina
 Cross Ange - Hilda's younger sister
 Girl Friend Beta - Misuzu Tōyama
 Invaders of the Rokujyōma!? - Megumi
 Jinsei - Ayaka Nikaidō
 Parasyte - Akiho Suzuki; Parasite, Mother Female, Voice inside Gotō
 Soreike! Anpanman - Yukidaruman
 The World Is Still Beautiful - Nike Lemercier
 BAR Kiraware Yasai - Tomato
 Cardfight!! Vanguard G - Female Student
 Cardfight!! Vanguard G GIRS Crisis - Shion's mother
 Concrete Revolutio - Rin
 Crayon Shin-chan - Pretty Girl A, University Student A
 Gate: Jieitai Kano Chi nite, Kaku Tatakaeri - Announcer
 Himouto! Umaru-chan - Child, Store employee, Teacher, Female student
 My Love Story!! - Mariya Saijō; female student 3
 Valkyrie Drive: Mermaid - Hexe
 Nurse Witch Komugi-chan R - Misuzu-Sensei
 Sekkō Boys - Kinue Yamashita
 Keijo - Hanabi Kawai 
 Minivan - Riviere
 Layton Mystery Tanteisha: Katori no Nazotoki File - Jennifer
 Mr. Tonegawa - Saeko Nishiguchi
 YU-NO: A Girl Who Chants Love at the Bound of this World - Kaori Asakura
 In/Spectre - Yosuzume, Yama no Ayakashi
 Dropout Idol Fruit Tart - Riri Higashi
 Farewell, My Dear Cramer - Rui Kikuchi
 Edens Zero - Fake Sister Ivry
 Helck - Hyura

Original video animation
 Lagrange: The Flower of Rin-ne: Kamogawa Days - Yuiha Shinjō
 Hetalia: The Beautiful World - Italy (female)

Original net animation
 Bonjour Sweet Love Patisserie - Misae Shimazu
 Momokuri - Rio Sakaki

Anime films
 Hunter × Hunter: Phantom Rouge - Machi

Video games
 Shironeko Project - Pastel
 Granado Espada - Elisabeth
 Alchemy Stars (2022) - Beretta

Dubbing
 Forbidden Games (New Era Movies edition), Berthe Dollé (Laurence Badie)
 Midsommar, Karin (Anna Åström)
 Spontaneous'', Mara Carlyle (Katherine Langford)

References

External links
 Official blog 
 Official agency profile 
 
 

1989 births
Living people
Japanese video game actresses
Japanese voice actresses
Tokyo Actor's Consumer's Cooperative Society voice actors
Voice actresses from Fukuoka Prefecture
21st-century Japanese actresses